HolidayJet was a short-lived brand name of Swiss airline Germania Flug  for flights to leisure destinations.

History
HolidayJet was a brand created in cooperation with Swiss tourism company Hotelplan in early 2015 to operate holiday flights. Germania Flug operated 18 scheduled destinations from Zürich Airport.  

However, HolidayJet stopped its collaboration with Germania Flug in November 2015. The brand has since been abandoned, while Germania Flug now operates several of the former HolidayJet routes under its own name, and as of 2019 as Chair Airlines.

Destinations

HolidayJet sold flights to the following destinations between March and November 2015:

Balearic Islands 
Palma de Mallorca

Canary Islands
Gran Canaria

Crete
Heraklion

Cyprus
Larnaca

Egypt
Hurghada
Marsa Alam
Sharm el-Sheikh

Finland
Kittilä

Greece
Corfu
Kos
Mykonos
Rhodes
Santorini
Zante

Switzerland
Zurich base

Tunisia
Djerba

Turkey
Antalya
Dalaman

Fleet
Germania Flug used one aircraft under the HolidayJet brand:

References

Defunct airlines of Switzerland
Airlines established in 2015
Airlines disestablished in 2015
Swiss companies disestablished in 2015
Swiss companies established in 2015